Koprivnik is a small dispersed settlement northwest of Žiri in the Upper Carniola region of Slovenia. It consists of isolated farms in the hills above the right bank of Sovodenjščica Creek (a.k.a. Hobovščica Creek), extending from the Javorščica Gorge to the hills above Fužine. The territory of the settlement ranges between 515 and 810 m in elevation.

References

External links

Koprivnik on Geopedia

Populated places in the Municipality of Žiri